Tickle is an English toponymic surname, derived from Tickhill in Yorkshire. Notable people with the surname include:

 Charlie Tickle (1883 – after 1919), English footballer
 Cheryll Tickle, British biologist
 Danny Tickle (born 1983), English rugby league footballer
 David Tickle, British record producer and engineer
 Gerard William Tickle (1909–1994), English prelate
 Jon Tickle (born 1974), British TV presenter
 Phyllis Tickle (1934–2015), American author and lecturer
 Sam Tickle (born 2002), English professional footballer
 Steven Ray Tickle, American television personality on Moonshiners and Tickle.

See also
 Tickle (disambiguation)
 Mr. Tickle, the first book in the Mr. Men series by Roger Hargreaves
 Tickell

English toponymic surnames